Isopogon dubius, commonly known as pincushion coneflower, is a species of plant in the family Proteaceae and is endemic to the south-west of Western Australia. It is a shrub with sharply-pointed, deeply lobed or pinnate leaves and more or less spherical heads of pink to reddish pink flowers.

Description
The flowers are arranged in sessile, more or less spherical heads  in diameter with many hairy, egg-shaped involucral bracts at the base.

Taxonomy
Pincushion coneflower was first formally described in 1830 by Robert Brown who gave it the name Petrophile dubia in the Supplementum to his Prodromus Florae Novae Hollandiae et Insulae Van Diemen from specimens collected in 1827 near the Swan River, by Charles Fraser. In 1917 George Claridge Druce changed the name to Isopogon dubius in  The Botanical Exchange Club and Society of the British Isles Report for 1916.

Distribution and habitat
Isopogon dubius grows in woodland and heath, mainly on the Darling Range from near Wongan Hills to Narrogin in the Avon Wheatbelt, Geraldton Sandplains, Jarrah Forest and Swan Coastal Plain in the south-west of Western Australia.

Conservation status
This isopogon is classified as "not threatened" by the Government of Western Australia Department of Parks and Wildlife.

Use in horticulture
Isopogon dubius was first cultivated in Europe in the 1800s. It prefers dry summers and excellent drainage and will tolerate moderate frosts. Full sun is required for the best flower display, although the plant can be grown in partial shade.

References

dubius
Eudicots of Western Australia
Plants described in 1830
Taxa named by Robert Brown (botanist, born 1773)